Pacita Abad (October 5, 1946 – December 7, 2004)  was born in Basco, Batanes, a small island in the northernmost part of the Philippines, between Luzon and Taiwan. Her more than 30-year painting career began when she traveled to the United States to undertake graduate studies. She exhibited her work in over 200 museums, galleries, and other venues, including 75 solo shows, around the world. Abad's work is now in public, corporate, and private art collections in over 70 countries.

Personal life

Daughter of Jorge A. Abad and Aurora Barsana Abad, who both served as congressman and congresswoman in Batanes. In 1968, Abad earned a BA degree in political science in University of the Philippines Diliman hoping to follow her parents' footsteps. While continuing her graduate studies in UP in 1969, Abad's father was victimized in an election fraud financed by President Marcos. She began organizing and joining student demonstrations in Manila against the Marcos regime. When their home in Manila was targeted and it was too dangerous for her to continue to stay in the Philippines, her parents sent her to Spain to continue her studies. On her way to Spain, she stopped by San Francisco to visit her relatives and decided to stay there to continue her studies. While waiting for a school, she worked as a secretary in Dooley Foundation in the day and as a seamstress at night, and earned a master's degree in Asian history at Lone Mountain College, which would later become part of the University of San Francisco, in 1971. Abad studied painting at the Corcoran School of Art in Washington, D.C. and The Art Students League in New York City. She lived on six continents and worked in more than 50 countries, including Guatemala, Mexico, India, Afghanistan, Yemen, Sudan, Mali, Papua New Guinea, Cambodia, and Indonesia. At the Corcoran School of Art, Abad studied under Berthold Schmutzhart and Blaine Larson, and the two professors helped launch her artistic career. Abad then pursued her studies at The Art Students League in New York where she concentrated on still life and figurative drawing under John Helicker and Robert Beverly Hale.

During Abad's time in San Francisco's art scene, she married painter George Kleiman, though they later separated. She traveled to art scenes across Asia for a year with Stanford business student Jack Garrity, then returned to the U.S. to study painting, first at the Corcoran School of Art in Washington D.C. and later, at The Art Students League in New York City. While in California, she married Garrity, who became an international development economist.

Works
Abad created over 4,500 artworks in her career. Her early paintings were primarily figurative socio-political works of people and primitive masks. Another series was large scale paintings of underwater scenes, tropical flowers, and animal wildlife. Pacita's most extensive body of work, however, is her vibrant, colorful abstract work - many very large scale canvases, but also a number of small collages - on a range of materials from canvas and paper to bark cloth, metal, ceramics, and glass. She painted the 55-meter long Alkaff Bridge in Singapore and covered it with 2,350 multicolored circles, just a few months before she died.

Abad developed a technique of trapunto painting (named after a quilting technique), which entailed stitching and stuffing her painted canvases to give them a three-dimensional, sculptural effect. She then began incorporating into the surface of her paintings materials such as traditional cloth, mirrors, beads, shells, plastic buttons, and other objects.

In 2021, a retrospective of the artist's work showed for the first time in Dubaï, titled I Thought the Streets Were Paved With Gold. The exhibition showed a wide selection of works from abstracted forms on padded canvas to social realist depictions of daily life painted and weaved, inspired by the artist's experience living in the United-States and the Philippines.

Awards and recognition
Abad received numerous awards during her artistic career. Her most memorable award was her first, the TOYM Award for Art in the Philippines in 1984. The Ten Outstanding Young Men (TOYM) is an award that had always been given to men, until 1984, when Abad became the first woman to receive this prestigious award. After she received the award, a public uproar erupted in which angry letters were sent by male artists to editors of published newspapers who thought that she should not have received the award. Despite this opposition, Abad was thrilled that she had broken the sex barrier, and she stated in her acceptance speech that "it was long overdue that Filipina women were recognized, as the Philippines was full of outstanding women", and proudly referred to her mother.
 "Parangal for Pacita Abad" - in memory of the late international artist, National Museum of the Philippines, January 2005
 "Art in Embassies - Indonesia", United States Department of State, September 2001
 "Pamana Ng Pilipino Award" for outstanding achievement in the arts, given by the President of the Philippines, Manila, June 2000
 "Plaque of Recognition to Pacita B. Abad, Ivatan Painter, Internationally Acclaimed Artist", from the Province of Batanes, 2000
 "Filipina Firsts", a compendium of 100 Filipino women who have broken ground in their fields of endeavor organized by the Philippine American Foundation in Manila and Washington, D.C., June 1998
 "Likha Award", marking the Centennial of Philippine Independence, given in recognition of outstanding achievement, June 1998
 "Art in Embassies - Philippines", United States Department of State, February 1996
 "Excellence 2000 Awards for the Arts", given by U.S. Pan Asian American Chamber of Commerce in Washington, D.C. (Website www.uspaacc.com), May 1995
 New York State Council on the Arts Grant for Visiting Artists Program at Amuan, 1993
 "Gwendolyn Caffritz Award", given by the Washington, D.C. Commission for the Arts, June 1992
 "Mid-Atlantic Arts Regional Fellowship", US, June 1992
 "D.C. Commission on the Arts Award", June 1990
 "MetroArt II Award: Six Masks from Six Continents", five-painting mural installed at Metro Center, Washington, D.C., June 1990
 "National Endowment for the Arts", Visual Arts Fellowship, 1989 to 1990, June 1989
 "D.C. Commission on the Arts Award", June 1989
 "TOYM Award" for the Most Outstanding Young Artist in the Philippines, July 1984

Illness and death
Abad died of lung cancer in 2004 in Singapore. She is buried in Batanes, Philippines, next to her studio which is called the Fundacion Pacita.

Legacy
Abad established a unique trapunto technique in painting, and has influenced numerous art scholars. She received numerous international awards in the field of painting. Her works have been acquired and prized by art museums in Tokyo, Paris, London, Singapore, San Francisco, New York City, Hong Kong, and Manila, among others. Her art has been in the national collections of at least 70 countries worldwide.

The Fundacion Pacita Batanes Nature Lodge in Basco, Batanes, "was lovingly refurbished" by her brother, Butch Abad.

Pacita Abad's works have been displayed in numerous galleries and museums in the Philippines during the annual Philippine Arts Month and art festivals.

On July 31, 1984, Abad won the Ten Outstanding Young Men award. On July 31, 2020 Google commemorates the anniversary of the award and also commemorates Abad's legacy through a doodle paying homage to her art style.

Quote
"I always see the world through colour, although my vision, perspective and paintings are constantly influenced by new ideas and changing environments. I feel like I am an ambassador of colours, always projecting a positive mood that helps make the world smile."

See also
 Shaped canvas
Filipino women artists

References

Further reading

External links

 Pacita on Brooklyn Museum's Feminist Art Base
 Pacita Abad's Artsy Page
 Pacita Abad's Website
 Pacita Abad's eBooks
 Pacita Abad on AWARE
 Pacita in Singapore and other Vimeo videos
 
 Pacita's Painted Bridge Website
 Interview with Jack Garrity
 Artnet.com
 Pacita Abad on Artstor

1946 births
2004 deaths
20th-century Filipino painters
20th-century women artists
Art Students League of New York alumni
Feminist artists
Filipino contemporary artists
Filipino expatriates in the United States
George Washington University Corcoran School alumni
People from Batanes
University of San Francisco alumni
University of the Philippines Diliman alumni
Deaths from lung cancer in Singapore